Viktor Alekseevich Radus Zenkovich (31 December 1877, Archangel – 4 October, 1967, Moscow) was a Russian revolutionary Bolshevik who attained public office of chairman of the council of People's Commissars in the Kirghiz Autonomous Soviet Socialist Republic and the Soviet Union.

He was a student at Moscow University and joined the Russian Social Democratic and Labour Party (RSDLP) in 1898. He was exiled to Irkutsk Oblast in 1902, but soon escaped from there to Geneva, where he became a compositor for the Iskra. However when the paper was taken over by the Mensheviks, he returned to Russia, where he got involved in party work for the RSDLP in Nikolaev, Baku, and Moscow and contributed to their military organisation in St. Petersburg and Helsinki.

He was brother-in-law of Viktor Nogin, another prominent Bolshevik.

References

1877 births
1957 deaths
Bolsheviks
Soviet political people
Revolutionaries from the Russian Empire